= Peace Mantra =

Peace Mantra Ping'an Jing
- Author: He Dian (贺电)
- Language: Chinese
- Publisher: People's Publishing House
- Publication place: China
- Pages: 356
- ISBN: 9787501459339

Peace Mantra or Ping'an Jing (simplified Chinese: 平安经; traditional Chinese: 平安經; pinyin: Píng'ān Jīng) is a Chinese book by former Jilin public security official He Dian. Despite its repetitive content (the book consists entirely of lines stating "Let...be safe" (。。。平安)), the book was promoted substantially by local authorities, leading to a controversy and discussions online about the practice of insincerely praising Chinese government officials and leaders. He was fired due to the controversy.
